St Columba's Church is a Church of Scotland Parish church that serves a Gaelic congregation in Glasgow.

History
The Church of Scotland congregation of St Columba in Glasgow dates back to 1770. It was established to cater for the spiritual needs of the large number of Gaelic speakers from the Highlands and Islands of Scotland settling in Glasgow in search of employment. The church still has a weekly Sunday service in Gaelic, as well as weekly services in English.

Shortly before leaving Scotland to permanently emigrate to South Africa in 1903, Mull-born Gaelic poet Duncan Livingstone carved the inscription Tigh Mo Chridhe, Tigh Mo Gràidh ("House of My Heart, House of My Love") on the lintel of the main door of the church.

The current church building in Glasgow's St Vincent Street was opened on Saturday 17 September 1904, and is built in the Gothic Revival style.  It was designed by architects Tennant and Burke and is now protected as a category B listed building. Because of its size and association with Gaeldom and the Gaelic language it is also popularly known as the Highland Cathedral.

Past ministers have included two former Moderators of the General Assembly: the Very Rev. Dr. Norman MacLeod (minister 1835-1862) and husband of poetess Agnes Maxwell MacLeod, in 1836; and the Very Reverend Dr Alexander MacDonald (minister 1929-1954) in 1948.

See also
List of Church of Scotland parishes
Presbytery of Glasgow
Gaelic-speaking congregations in the Church of Scotland

References

External links 
 Official website.

Saint Columba Church, Glasgow
Columba
Category B listed buildings in Glasgow
Listed churches in Glasgow
1770 establishments in Scotland
Churches completed in 1904
20th-century Church of Scotland church buildings
Religious organizations established in 1770